Dduallt (pronounced ) is a mountain in central Snowdonia, north Wales. It is the sister peak of Rhobell Fawr.

It lies north of the A494 between Dolgellau and Llanuwchllyn. Its eastern slopes are the source of the Afon Dyfrdwy (River Dee).

References

External links
 Dduallt is at coordinates 
www.geograph.co.uk : photos of Dduallt and surrounding area

Hewitts of Wales
Nuttalls
Mountains and hills of Snowdonia
Llanuwchllyn
Mountains and hills of Gwynedd